WTBD-FM (97.5 MHz) is a Top-40 radio station licensed to Delhi, New York.  WTBD-FM is owned by Townsquare License, LLC.

References

External links
WTBD-FM's website

Contemporary hit radio stations in the United States
TBD-FM
Townsquare Media radio stations